Suzanne Charny is an American actress, dancer, and sculptor.

Early years
Charny was raised in Brooklyn and attended the High School for the Performing Arts in New York City.

Career
When she was 15, Charny skipped school to go to an audition, gaining a role as a "Shark" girl in a production of West Side Story that toured Australia. Her first big break came in early 1965, when she was cast as one of the featured dancers in the weekly NBC musical variety series Hullabaloo, which aired until spring of 1966. In 1967, she guest starred on That Girl as Donald’s computer-match "date". She was the lead female dancer of "The Rich Man's Frug" sequence in the original Broadway production of Sweet Charity and reprised the role in the movie version (1969).  From 1970 to 1986, she frequently appeared on television shows including The Night Stalker, Kojak, The Rockford Files, Starsky & Hutch, The Incredible Hulk and others.

In 1969, Charny danced in productions for military personnel as part of Bob Hope's annual tour to entertain U. S. troops overseas.

Charny is also a sculptor. Her figural work is based on her career as a dancer and includes representations of dancers in motion. She notes that growing up in Brooklyn, she was inspired to model the human form by watching her father build larger-than-life nude sand sculptures at Brighton Beach.

Awards and honors
Charny was a 2004 recipient of the Professional Dancers Society's Gypsy Robe in honor of her contributions to the field of dance.

Filmography

Television

References

External links

Living people
American female dancers
American dancers
American stage actresses
American television actresses
American film actresses
21st-century American women
Year of birth missing (living people)
United Service Organizations entertainers